Events from the year 1932 in Ireland.

Incumbents
 Governor-General:
 James McNeill (until 1 November)
 Domhnall Ua Buachalla (from 27 November)
 President of the Executive Council: 
 W. T. Cosgrave (CnaG) (until 9 March)
 Éamon de Valera (FF) (from 9 March)

Events
6 January – sale of the pro-Fianna Fáil Derry Journal in Donegal is briefly prohibited.
29 January – Dáil Éireann is dissolved by the Governor-General, James McNeill, bringing ten years of Cumann na nGaedheal rule to an end.
16 February – 1932 Irish general election, results in formation of the first Fianna Fáil government under Éamon de Valera.
March – meteorological observatory moved from Valentia Island to Westwood House near Cahirciveen.
8 March – members of the new Fianna Fáil government meet with members of the Labour Party to discuss unemployment, housing, the Oath and other issues.
9 March – Members of the 7th Dáil assemble.
10 March – one of the first actions of the new Fianna Fáil government is the release of 23 political prisoners.
18 March – the new government suspends the Public Safety Act, lifting the prohibition on a number of organisations including the Irish Republican Army. As a reaction to renewed IRA activity, former National Army Commandant Ned Cronin founds the Army Comrades Association, known as the Blueshirts.
31 March – Dublin Corporation is considering removing Nelson's Pillar from O'Connell Street, Dublin on the grounds that it is an obstruction to traffic.
19 May – the Constitution (Removal of Oath) Bill is passed in Dáil Éireann.
21 May – Amelia Earhart, the first woman to fly solo across the Atlantic, lands just outside Derry having taken 14 hours to cross the ocean.
9 June – Éamon de Valera and some members of his government leave for discussions with the British Government concerning the Ottawa Conference.
14 June – the first pictures of the atom-splitting apparatus are released. The machine was constructed by Dr. John Cockcroft and Dr. Ernest Walton of Trinity College Dublin.
21 June – ocean liners carrying thousands of pilgrims from the United States, Lapland and the Netherlands arrive in Irish ports for the Eucharistic Congress.
22 June – the 31st International Eucharistic Congress opens in Dublin Pro-Cathedral, the greatest gathering of Church dignitaries that Ireland has ever seen. The "Blue Hussars", the ceremonial Mounted Escort of the Irish Army, make their first public appearance as a guard of honour for the Papal Legate, Cardinal Lauri.
23 June – 2,000 men attend mass at a High Altar in the Phoenix Park.
24 June – 200,000 women are addressed by the Archbishop of Edinburgh at mass in the Phoenix Park.
26 June – almost a million worshippers attend Pontifical Mass in the Phoenix Park in the final ceremony of the Eucharistic Congress.
30 June – the third Tailteann Games open in Croke Park, Dublin. 
1 August – at the Los Angeles Olympic Games, Bob Tisdall wins the 400-metre hurdles. Another Irishman, Dr. Pat O'Callaghan, wins gold in the hammer-throwing event.
18 August – Scottish aviator Jim Mollison takes off from Portmarnock Strand to become the first pilot to make an East-to-West solo transatlantic flight.
23 August – Cumann na nGaedheal leader W. T. Cosgrave criticises Fianna Fáil's policy of retaining the land annuities.
26 September – Éamon de Valera gives his inaugural speech as President of the League of Nations. He criticises complacent resolutions where the demand is for effective action.
9 October – at a Cumann na nGaedheal meeting in County Limerick batons are drawn and shots are fired as General Richard Mulcahy tries to address the crowd.
19 October – unemployed Dubliners march through the streets of Dublin to Leinster House where they hand in a petition to Seán T. O'Kelly.
October – Anglo-Irish Trade War begins.
16 November – the Prince of Wales travels to Belfast for the first time to open the new parliament building at Stormont.
22 November – the new Northern Ireland Parliament building at Stormont is officially opened.
26 November – Domhnall Ua Buachalla succeeds James McNeill as Governor-General of the Irish Free State.

Arts and literature
7 March – Dublin Corporation demands the return of the Hugh Lane pictures from the Tate Gallery in London.
 Austin Clarke's first novel, The Bright Temptation: a romance, is prohibited in Ireland by the Censorship of Publications Board.
 Francis Stuart's novels Pigeon Irish and The Coloured Dome.
 W. B. Yeats leases Riversdale house in the Dublin suburb of Rathfarnham and publishes Words for Music Perhaps, and Other Poems.
 Seán Ó Faoláin publishes his first collection, Midsummer Night Madness and Other Stories, in London.
 Nineteen Irish writers led by Yeats and George Bernard Shaw form an Academy of Irish Letters primarily to oppose the Censorship of Publications Board.
 The first sound film made in Ireland, The Voice of Ireland, is directed by Col. Victor Haddick.
 American dancer Adele Astaire marries English aristocrat Lord Charles Arthur Francis Cavendish (9 May) and they settle at Lismore Castle, one of the Devonshire family seats.

Sport

Football

League of Ireland
Winners: Shamrock Rovers
FAI Cup
Winners: Shamrock Rovers 1 – 0 Dolphins

Golf
Irish Open is won by Alf Padgham (England).

Births
29 January – Bernard Cowen, Fianna Fáil TD and Minister of State (died 1984).
31 January – Pete St. John, born Peter Mooney, folk singer-songwriter (died 2022).
8 February – Raymond James Boland, Bishop of the Roman Catholic Diocese of Kansas City-Saint Joseph (died 2014).
28 February – Noel Cantwell, international soccer player (died 2005).
7 March – Johnny McGovern, Kilkenny hurler (died 2022).
10 March – Brigid Hogan-O'Higgins, Fine Gael TD (died 2022).
29 March – Richard Burke, Fine Gael politician and European Commissioner (died 2016).
1 June – Michael Lipper, Labour Party politician and TD (died 1987).
5 June
Christy Brown, author, painter and poet (died 1981).
Ronnie Dawson, rugby union.
12 June – Alfred Cooper, cricketer.
7 July – Eileen Lemass, Fianna Fáil TD and MEP.
20 July – Ronan Keane, Chief Justice of Ireland.
2 August – Peter O'Toole, actor (died 2013).
14 August – Denis Faul, monsignor, Northern Ireland civil rights activist, chaplain to prisoners in Maze Prison during 1981 Irish Hunger Strike (died 2006).
21 August – Gene Fitzgerald, Fianna Fáil TD and MEP (died 2007).
26 August – Dermot Curtis, soccer player.
3 November – Albert Reynolds, Taoiseach and leader of Fianna Fáil (died 2014).
15 December – Edna O'Brien, novelist.
29 December – Eileen Desmond, Labour Party TD, Cabinet Minister, MEP and Seanad Éireann member (died 2005).
Full date unknown
Barney Eastwood, boxing promoter (died 2020).
Anne Madden, painter (born in London).
Breandán Ó Madagáin, scholar and writer on traditional Irish song (died 2020).

Deaths
1 January – J. J. Clancy, Sinn Féin TD, member of 1st Dáil (b. c1891).
1 January – Margaret Pearse, Fianna Fáil politician, mother of Patrick Pearse and Willie Pearse (born 1857).
17 January – Louis Brennan, inventor (born 1852).
8 February – Mad Dog Coll, mob hitman in New York (born 1908).
26 February – Robert Donovan, cricketer (born 1899).
4 March – James Henry Reynolds, recipient of the Victoria Cross for gallantry in 1879 at Rorke's Drift, South Africa (born 1844).
11 March – Thomas Hunter, member of 1st Dáil representing Cork North East (born 1883).
13 March – John Atkinson, Baron Atkinson, politician and judge, Attorney-General for Ireland and Law Lord (born 1844).
26 March – Horace Plunkett, politician, agricultural reformer and writer (born 1854).
22 May – Augusta, Lady Gregory, dramatist and folklorist (born 1852).
12 June – Catherine Coll, mother of Éamon de Valera (born 1858).
27 June – Arthur Godley, 1st Baron Kilbracken, civil servant, Permanent Under-Secretary of State for India (born 1847).
14 October – Katherine Plunket, botanical artist and oldest ever person both born and died in Ireland ever (born 1820).

References

 
1930s in Ireland
Ireland
Years of the 20th century in Ireland